John McLachlan (born 5 March 1964) is an Irish composer.

Life
McLachlan was born in Dublin, son of the writer Leland Bardwell, and studied at the DIT Conservatory of Music and Drama (1982–6), the Royal Irish Academy of Music (1989–97), and Trinity College Dublin (BA 1988), where he received a Ph.D. in musicology in 1999 for a study of the relationship between analysis and compositional technique in the post-war avant-garde. He has also studied privately with Robert Hanson (1989–90) and Kevin Volans (1994–5). He now lives in Inishowen, County Donegal.

He has written numerous articles for The Journal of Music in Ireland (2000–10; now the online Journal of Music). He was executive director of the Association of Irish Composers (AIC; 1998–2012), and in 2007 he was elected to Aosdána.

McLachlan was the featured composer in the RTÉ National Symphony Orchestra's "Horizons" series in 2003 and 2008. He has also represented Ireland at international festivals, including the ISCM World Music Days in Slovenia in 2003 and Croatia in 2005. In 2006, his work Grand Action was commissioned as a test-piece for the AXA Dublin International Piano Competition.

Music
McLachlan's musical aesthetic is largely shaped by a desire to impart a sense of narrative and expectation to his music without recourse to pastiche rhetorical devices. A critic wrote of a recording of McLachlan's piano piece Nine: "The style of each little piece sends one's imagination and musical memory reeling, some of them evoking French Impressionism, some jazzy in feel, some reminiscent of the miniatures for piano of Webern, and none of them in any way, shape or form derivative." Much of his music is structured in contrasting and suddenly changing block-like sections of homogeneous material. The material within these sections is propelled by a rigorous focus on subtle rhythmic and melodic permutations, which result in both surface opacity and gradually increasing tension.

Select compositions

Orchestral
Concerto for Chamber Orchestra (1988)
Here Be Dragons (2003)
Triptych (2004)
Octala (2007)
Incunabula (2007)
Taca (2011)
The Inishowen Set (2013)

Chamber music
Two Lyric Sketches (1987; rev. 1991), for string quartet
Heuristic Pieces (1990; rev. 2003), for clarinet, horn, violin, viola, cello
Suspirations 1 (1991), for 3 trumpets, horn, trombone
Suspirations 2 (1991; rev. 1992), for clarinet, oboe, horn, violin, cello, double bass
Frieze (1993), for flute, oboe, clarinet, horn, percussion, violin, cello, double bass
Concords (1997), for clarinet, violin, cello, piano
Meetings with Remarkable Men (2001), for 4 percussionists
Filament of Memory (2002), for 4 guitars
Radical Roots (2003), for violin, viola, cello [rescored for 2 pianos, 2005]
neo-plastic coloured shapes (2003), for string quartet
The Metal Pig (2004), for clarinet, violin, cello, piano
Ghost Machine (2004), for violin and piano
Fragile (2004), for alto flute and guitar
Leaves Loose (2006), for piccolo/flute/alto-flute/bass-flute, oboe/oboe d'amore/cor anglais, clarinet/bass-clarinet
Wonder (2008), for clarinet, glockenspiel, organ, e-guitar, violin, double bass
Extraordinary Rendition (2008), for violin, cello, piano
Natural Order (2009), for violin, cello, piano
Five Points, Manhattan (2010), for 7 percussionists
Where we are (2012), for string quartet
Fragment (After Lafcadio Hearn) (2016), for speaker and piano
Deliquescence (Leland Bardwell) (2016), for soprano, clarinet, piano
Glad it Was the Sun (2016), for string quartet
Venise en hiver (Jeanine Baude) (1995), for mezzo-soprano, alto sax, piano
Diomedea (2017), for saxophone and contrabass recorder doubling treble recorder
Isola (2019), for flute/alto flute and piano
Headland (2021), for violin, viola, cello, piano, flute, clarinet, bassoon and fixed media

Solo instrumental
Five Movements for Piano (1983)
Four Short Pieces for Guitar (1988)
Two Piano Studies (1994)
From the Strings of a Rainbow (1996), for piano
Fifteen Easy Miniatures (1998), for piano
Archaeopteryx (1996; rev. 1997), for piano
Here Be Dragons (2001; rev. 2003), for organ
Nuance (2003), for piano
Grand Action (2005), for piano
Soft Landing (2009), for organ
Nine (2011), for piano
Drinking the Stars (2012), for piano
Ex Machina (2013), for piano
Filament(s) I to VI (2014-18), solo pieces for flute, trombone, cello, bassoon, guitar, clarinet
Sweeney Exulans (2018), for Irish harp
Under the Flagstones (2018), for organ
fiaili ceoil (2019), for piano
Stone Bell and Sandwave (2020), for piano

Choral works
Two Akhmatova Settings (Anna Akhmatova) (1986), for mixed chorus
Two Poems in Memoriam Stevie Smith (Leland Bardwell) (1986), for mixed chorus
Lord, What Love Have I (Psalm 119) (1988), for mixed chorus and organ
He Wishes for the Cloths of Heaven (W.B. Yeats) (1995), for mixed chorus
The Eternal Rebel (Eva Gore-Booth) (2016), for soprano, tenor, choir, piano, keyboard, harmonica

Electro-acoustic works
The Red Thread (2000), for guitar and electro-acoustics
Golden Circle (2010), for flute, clarinet, violin, cello, piano, electro-acoustics
Dog Ear (2013) fixed media
Aurora (2013), for flute/bass-flute, clarinet/bass-clarinet, cello, piano, electro-acoustics
Sparsa (2015) fixed media
Sympathetic Strings (2016), for guitar and electro-acoustics
This is Real (2019), for violin, viola, cello, bass, string orchestra, electro-acoustics
Twelve Celestial Objects (2020) fixed media

Bibliography
Adrian Smith: "McLachlan, John", in: The Encyclopaedia of Music in Ireland, edited by Harry White and Barra Boydell (Dublin: UCD Press, 2013), p. 654–5.
Benjamin Dwyer: "Interview with John Mclachlan", in: Different Voices: Irish Music and Music in Ireland (Hofheim: Wolke Verlag, 2014), p. 178–191.

Discography
First, CD of six of McLachlan's pieces featuring various musicians including RTE National Symphony Orchestra https://digital.farpointrecordings.com/album/first
Filament of Memory, Dublin Guitar Quartet, Contemporary Irish https://www.dublinguitarquartet.com/copy-of-deleted-pieces
Nine, Gothic, Mary Dullea, Metier Records https://divineartrecords.com/recording/gothic-new-piano-music-from-ireland/
Four Pieces for Guitar, Islands, John Feeley, Overture Music https://www.cmc.ie/shop/islands-contemporary-irish-solo-and-ensemble-works-guitar
Grand Action, Maria McGarry, CMC CD 9
Here be Dragons, David Adams, Irish Contemporary Organ Music
Two Lyric Sketches, Hibernia trio + Ken Rice quartet, AIC CD1

Writings on Music
Articles by John McLachlan in the Journal of Music

References

External links
Composer's website
Profile at the Contemporary Music Centre, Dublin
YouTube video of a performance of Nine
YouTube video of a performance of Golden Circle
YouTube video of a performance of Aurora
YouTube video of a performance of Extraordinary Rendition

1964 births
20th-century classical composers
20th-century male musicians
21st-century classical composers
21st-century male musicians
Alumni of Dublin Institute of Technology
Alumni of the Royal Irish Academy of Music
Alumni of Trinity College Dublin
Aosdána members
Irish classical composers
Irish male classical composers
Living people
Modernist composers
Musicians from Dublin (city)